Gregory Lorenzana, Jr. (born May 11, 1980 in Long Beach, California, U.S.), better known as Guji (pronounced "Goo-G") Lorenzana or simply Guji, is a Filipino-American singer, songwriter, actor, host, club DJ, commercial model and former radio DJ for Mellow 94.7 (2008-2010).

Guji embarked on his music career in 2006, releasing two independent albums in the Philippines.

As a talent of ABS-CBN's Star Magic (a.k.a. Star Circle) Batch 16, he was officially launched as a singer on ASAP 08 on August 17, 2008.

Guji's first major project was with ABS-CBN as an actor, starring him alongside Kaye Abad in the TV adaptation of popular Tagalog pocketbook, Precious Hearts Romances Presents: The Bud Brothers, where Guji played the role of Rei, the "loveteam" partner of Pepper (Kaye Abad), gaining him initial acting notoriety in 2009.

On August 17, 2017, Guji signed an exclusive 5-year management contract with Viva Entertainment's Viva Artists Agency, after being managed by Star Magic for the past 9 years.

Guji continuously works in music and is often seen in Metro Manila's live music scene,  singing with his project bands.

On September 27, 2017, Guji signed with Warner Music Philippines. His first single under Warner Music was scheduled for release in October 2017.

Theater

Filmography

Television

Film

Music video appearances

Discography

* Ogie Alcasid first wrote and released "I'll Be Yours Forever" on his Better Man album, yet never became a single
** Keith Martin's popular hit song, "Because of You", which was covered several times by other Filipino artists, was re-made into a Tagalog version for the first time by Guji (entitled "Dahil Sa Iyo")
*** "Five Days More" was released under the birth name of Guji, Gregory Lorenzana

Awards and nominations

Notes

References

External links
Official Website

1980 births
Living people
American musicians of Filipino descent
Male actors from Long Beach, California
Star Magic
Viva Artists Agency
Filipino male models
American models of Filipino descent
The Voice of the Philippines contestants
University of California, Davis alumni